Calexico–Mexicali is a transborder agglomeration in southeastern California (in the United States) and northwestern Baja California (in Mexico) with its center being the border between the sister cities of Calexico and Mexicali. The agglomeration lies within a large geologic region known as the Salton Trough with the city of Calexico located in the Imperial Valley on the United States side of the border, and Mexicali located in the Mexicali Valley on the Mexico side of the border.

Calexico–Mexicali is one of two transborder agglomerations on the California-Baja California Border; the other is San Diego–Tijuana.

References

Calexico, California
Mexicali
Twin cities
El Centro metropolitan area
Metropolitan areas of Baja California
Metropolitan areas of California
Transborder agglomerations
Mexicali Municipality
Populated places in Imperial County, California